The 6 Metre was a sailing event on the Sailing at the 1924 Summer Olympics program in Le Havre. A program of matches and semi-finals were scheduled. In case of a tie sail-off's would be held. 27 sailors, on 9 boats from 9 nations competed.

Race schedule

Course area and course configuration

Weather conditions

Results

Final results 
Competitors who scored a first or a second place in the matches were qualified (Q) for the semi-finals.

Daily standings

Notes 
In the 6 Metre each boat has a specific design that have to stay within certain formula. The outcome of the formula must be less than 6 Metre. During these Olympic races boats were used of the following designers:

Other information 

During the Sailing regattas at the 1924 Summer Olympics among others the following persons were competing in the various classes:
 Eugen Lunde (NOR) – Gold medalist
 Joop Carp (NED)
 Léon Huybrechts (BEL)

Further reading 
 
"Olympics, 1924". International Six Metre Archive. Retrieved 25 January 2021.

References 

6 Metre
6 Metre (keelboat)